The 1980 Richmond 400 was a NASCAR Winston Cup Series racing event that took place on February 24, 1980, at Richmond Fairgrounds Raceway (now Richmond Raceway) in Richmond, Virginia.

The NASCAR Winston Cup Series was also plagued with top teams running big engines and finishing in third place to avoid inspection around the early-1980s.

Background
In 1953, Richmond International Raceway began hosting the Grand National Series with Lee Petty winning that first race in Richmond.  The original track was paved in 1968.  In 1988, the track was re-designed into its present D-shaped configuration

The name for the raceway complex was "Strawberry Hill" until the Virginia State Fairgrounds site was bought out in 1999 and renamed the "Richmond International Raceway".

Race report
There were 35 American-born male drivers on the grid. Darrell Waltrip defeated Bobby Allison by 1.2 seconds in front of 17,000 people. Nine caution flags for 72 laps along with 19 different lead changes resulted in a race that lasted three hours and twelve minutes. Millikan flipped over the guardrail in Turn 3 after two other cars in front of him got together; he would eventually bow out of the race at lap 101.

Richard Childress (racing for himself at Richard Childress Racing) would be the last driver to actually finish the race. He would drive an Oldsmobile as opposed to the Chevrolet vehicles that he would own today.

Bill Hollar ends up sidelined by a mechanical gremlin as he makes his final NASCAR Winston Cup start. He'd attempt a few races later in the 1980s but didn't qualify for any of them.

Notable crew chiefs that fully participated in this race included Junie Donlavey, Joey Arrington, Darrell Bryant, Dale Inman, Bud Moore, Tim Brewer, Kirk Shelmerdine, Jake Elder among others.

Tommy Houston would make his NASCAR debut here while Joey Arrington would retire here. Joe Booher would make his best career finish here.

Top 10 finishers

Timeline
Section reference: 
 Start of race: Darrell Waltrip started the race with the pole position.
 Lap 34: Bobby Allison took over the lead from Darrell Waltrip.
 Lap 42: Joe Millikan took over the lead from Bobby Allison.
 Lap 43: Tommy Houston took over the lead from Joe Millikan.
 Lap 52: Dick Brooks, Jimmy Means, and Baxter Price suddenly became victims of a terminal crash.
 Lap 53: Harry Gant took over the lead from Tommy Houston.
 Lap 63: Oil pump issues managed to eliminate Benny Parsons from the event.
 Lap 81: Richard Petty took over the lead from Harry Gant.
 Lap 93: Bobby Allison took over the lead from Richard Petty.
 Lap 103: Richard Petty took over the lead from Bobby Allison.
 Lap 104: Joe Millikan became the victim of a terminal crash.
 Lap 105: Dave Marcis took over the lead from Richard Petty.
 Lap 112: Richard Petty took over the lead from Dave Marcis.
 Lap 125: The engine on Ronny Thomas' vehicle stopped working in a proper manner.
 Lap 155: Darrell Waltrip took over the lead from Richard Petty.
 Lap 195: Cale Yarbrough became a victim of a terminal crash.
 Lap 197: An axle came loose off Terry Labonte's vehicle.
 Lap 198: Bobby Allison took over the lead from Darrell Waltrip.
 Lap 245: Dave Marcis took over the lead from Bobby Allison.
 Lap 249: Bobby Allison took over the lead from Dave Marcis.
 Lap 269: Dave Marcis took over the lead from Bobby Allison.
 Lap 274: Bobby Allison took over the lead from Dave Marcis.
 Lap 281: Bill Hollar's vehicle developed ignition problems.
 Lap 293: Darrell Waltrip took over the lead from Bobby Allison.
 Lap 346: Bobby Allison took over the lead from Darrell Waltrip.
 Lap 369: Richard Petty took over the lead from Bobby Allison.
 Lap 382: Darrell Waltrip took over the lead from Richard Petty.
 Finish: Darrell Waltrip was officially declared the winner of the event.

Standings after the race

References

Richmond 400
Richmond 400
NASCAR races at Richmond Raceway